The Homebreaker is a 1919 American silent comedy film directed by Victor Schertzinger and written by John Lynch and R. Cecil Smith. The film stars Dorothy Dalton, Douglas MacLean, Edwin Stevens, Frank Leigh, Beverly Travis, and Nora Johnson. The film was released on April 20, 1919 by Paramount Pictures. It is presumed to be a lost film.

Plot
As described in a film magazine, Mary Marbury (Dalton), a traveling saleswoman for Abbott and Son and incidentally the fiancée of Raymond Abbott (MacLean), the son, returns from a trip to find that Raymond and his sister Lois (Johnson) are spending afternoons and evenings with Fernando Poyntier (Leigh), a pseudo Russian nobleman, and his supposed sister Marcia (Travis). With the assistance of Jonas Abbott (Stevens), father of Raymond and Lois, she decides to bring them to their senses. Consequently, she speeds up a bit with Jonas as her companion. At about the time she has worried Raymond that she will marry his father, Fernando and his supposed sister rob the house. The plot is further complicated by Fernando attempting to double-cross his confederate and elope with Lois. Mary stumbles onto the truth while on a yacht trip with the elder Abbott. The arrest of the crooks follows and Mary wins back Raymond.

Cast
Dorothy Dalton as Mary Marbury
Douglas MacLean as Raymond Abbott
Edwin Stevens as Jonas Abbott
Frank Leigh as Fernando Poyntier
Beverly Travis as Marcia Poyntier
Nora Johnson as Lois Abbott
Mollie McConnell as Mrs. White
Rudolph Valentino as Dance extra (uncredited)

References

External links 
 

1919 films
1910s English-language films
Silent American comedy films
1919 comedy films
Paramount Pictures films
Films directed by Victor Schertzinger
American black-and-white films
Lost American films
American silent feature films
1919 lost films
Lost comedy films
1910s American films